Emborough is a village and civil parish  north of Shepton Mallet, and  north east of Wells, in the Mendip district of Somerset, England. It adjoins the parish of Ston Easton. It is situated on the B3139 between Radstock and Wells, just off the A37 road.

History

The name Emborough means smooth hill.

The parish was part of the hundred of Chewton.

The parish includes two manor houses occupied by the Hippisley or Hippisley Coxe families since Elizabethan times. They bought the manor in 1570. The current  Manor Farmhouse is medieval in origin, with some early 17th century alteration, and further work in the 19th century.

Governance

The parish meeting has responsibility for local issues,, but does not set a precept, nor have any assets, nor costs. The parish meeting evaluates local planning applications and works with the local police, district council officers, and neighbourhood watch groups on matters of crime, security, and traffic. The parish meeting's role includes consulting with the district council on the maintenance, repair, and improvement of highways, drainage, footpaths, public transport, and street cleaning. Conservation matters (including trees and listed buildings) and environmental issues are also the responsibility of the council.

The village falls within the Non-metropolitan district of Mendip, which was formed on 1 April 1974 under the Local Government Act 1972, having previously been part of Shepton Mallet Rural District, which is responsible for local planning and building control, local roads, council housing, environmental health, markets and fairs, refuse collection and recycling, cemeteries and crematoria, leisure services, parks, and tourism.

Somerset County Council is responsible for running the largest and most expensive local services such as education, social services, libraries, main roads, public transport, policing and  fire services, trading standards, waste disposal and strategic planning.

It is also part of the Somerton and Frome  county constituency represented in the House of Commons of the Parliament of the United Kingdom. It elects one Member of Parliament (MP) by the first past the post system of election. It was part of the South West England constituency of the European Parliament prior to Britain leaving the European Union in January 2020, which elected six MEPs using the d'Hondt method of party-list proportional representation.

Geography

Emborough is close to the Emborough Quarries Site of Special Scientific Interest.

Emborough Pond (also known as Lechmere Water) is a  lake just south of the village. It was originally a much smaller mill pond. It was held by monks on a 51-year lease from 1525 who stocked it with bream, tench, perch and roach, as they were not allowed to eat meat but were allowed to eat fish. In 1533 locals came and took the fish then throwing down the dam. It is now used for Carp angling.

Religious sites

The parish Church of the Blessed Virgin Mary is medieval in origin but underwent extensive renovation in the 18th century. The inside includes a Georgian gallery and a cast iron "Gurney Stove". It has been designated as a Grade II* listed building.
The church is in the care of the Churches Conservation Trust.

References

External links

Villages in Mendip District
Civil parishes in Somerset